Bodešče is a village on the left bank of the Sava Bohinjka River in the Municipality of Bled in the Upper Carniola region of Slovenia.

Name
Bodešče was attested in written sources as Podesich in 1185, Fodesich in 1253, Vodaschize in 1287, and Bodoschichk in 1368, among other spellings.

Church
The village church is dedicated to Saint Leonard and was allegedly built on the site of an ancient fort. The church has a covered porch, a square nave, and a narrow Gothic star-vaulted presbytery, dating to the mid-15th century. The church tower has an onion-shaped Baroque wooden crown.

References

External links

Bodešče at Geopedia

Populated places in the Municipality of Bled